North Carolina's 44th Senate district is one of 50 districts in the North Carolina Senate. It has been represented by Republican Ted Alexander since 2019.

Geography
Since 2019, the district has covered all of Cleveland and Lincoln counties, as well as part of Gaston County. The district overlaps with the 97th, 108th, 110th, and 111th state house districts.

District officeholders since 2003

Election results

2022

2020

2018

2016

2014

2012

2010

2008

2006

2004

2002

References

North Carolina Senate districts
Cleveland County, North Carolina
Lincoln County, North Carolina
Gaston County, North Carolina